Eric Hottmann (born 8 February 2000) is a German professional footballer who plays as a forward for Energie Cottbus.

Career
Hottmann made his professional debut for Sonnenhof Großaspach in the 3. Liga on 20 July 2019, coming on as a substitute in the 75th minute for Dan-Patrick Poggenberg in a 4–1 away loss against MSV Duisburg.

References

External links
 
 
 

2000 births
Living people
German footballers
Germany youth international footballers
Association football forwards
VfB Stuttgart II players
SG Sonnenhof Großaspach players
Türkgücü München players
FC Energie Cottbus players
3. Liga players
Regionalliga players
People from Aalen
Sportspeople from Stuttgart (region)
Footballers from Baden-Württemberg